Sevuloni Mocenacagi  (born 19 June 1990) comes from Nukuilau, Navosa on the Island of Viti Levu plays as a forward or centre in the Fiji national rugby sevens team.  According to Gareth Baber, the coach of the Fiji Sevens team: "Last year he [Mocenacagi] was a forward and this year we're using him in that centre position. He's a threat every time he gets the ball, he's a big powerful runner."

Mocenacagi was part of the Fiji sevens team that won a silver medal at the 2022 Commonwealth Games. He also won a gold medal at the 2022 Rugby World Cup Sevens in Cape Town.

Honours & Awards 

 Player of the Final Vancouver Sevens 2018

References

1990 births
Living people
Fijian rugby sevens players
Commonwealth Games medallists in rugby sevens
Commonwealth Games silver medallists for Fiji
Rugby sevens players at the 2018 Commonwealth Games
People from Nadroga-Navosa Province
Rugby sevens players at the 2022 Commonwealth Games
Medallists at the 2018 Commonwealth Games
Medallists at the 2022 Commonwealth Games